Jonathan Philip Wacks is an American film director, producer and screenwriter.

He has directed a number of films including Powwow Highway, produced by George Harrison.  The film won the Sundance Film Festival Filmmaker’s Trophy, was nominated for four Independent Spirit Awards, and won awards for best picture, director, and actor at the American Indian Film Festival in San Francisco.

Wacks’ first film, Crossroads/South Africa (PBS), won a Student Academy Award in the documentary category.  He then produced the acclaimed cult-hit Repo Man, starring Emilio Estevez and Harry Dean Stanton, and directed Mystery Date (Orion), starring Ethan Hawke and Teri Polo and Ed and His Dead Mother, starring Steve Buscemi and Ned Beatty. He also directed an array of TV productions including 21 Jump Street, with Johnny Depp, Sirens and Going To Extremes.

Prior to his career as a director, Wacks served as Vice President of Production at the Samuel Goldwyn Company.  He is a former Chairman of the Board of the Independent Feature Project/West (now Film Independent), the largest organization of independent filmmakers in America, and has served on the selection committee of the Writers’ Program at the Sundance Institute.  His work has been seen at numerous international film festivals including Sundance, Montreal, Tokyo, Florence, London, Leipzig, Leeds, Cape Town, Deauville, New York, Munich, and Berlin.

Wacks has written several screenplays including, Recoil based on the Jim Thompson novel, "No Cure for Love", "My African Heart", "Coldsleep Lullaby", and "Stuck".  He served as Chair of the Visual and Media Arts Department at Emerson College, Head of the Film Department at the Vancouver Film School in British Columbia and Chair of the Moving Image Arts Department at the College of Santa Fe.  He was also Director of Garson Studios in Santa Fe.  Wacks holds a BA (Hons.) from the University of Essex (UK) and an MFA from the UCLA School of Theater, Film and Television.  He is a member of the Directors Guild of America.

Early life
Wacks was born in Johannesburg, South Africa on July 4, 1948 to Harry and Sonya Wacks (née Feldman). He has an older brother Raymond Wacks and a younger sister Gillian Pires. He is married to Margaret McNally.  They have two children Daniel and Anna.  Daniel is married to Ellisa Glover Blackwell and lives in the Bay Area, California and have a daughter named Maya. Anna lives in San Diego, California and is married to Michael Weitz. They have a son named Andrew.

Wacks attended Greenside High School in Johannesburg and spent a year as an AFS exchange student at West Geauga High School in Ohio.  He attended the University of the Witwatersrand majoring in philosophy before his departure to Jerusalem where he spent a year at the Hebrew University.  He completed a BA (hons.) degree in Latin American politics at the University of Essex, Uk. He returned to South Africa in 1973 and taught sociology at the University of Cape Town.  In 1977 he received a scholarship to attend UCLA Film School where he graduated a Master of Fine Arts.

Current position
Wacks is the Founding Director of the Barry R. Feirstein Graduate School of Cinema and Professor in Film at Brooklyn College.

References

Sources
Crain's New York Business: NYC film school taps 21 Jump Street director
Best Sundance Films: Jonathan Wacks – Powwow Highway
New York Times: Jonathan Wacks

External links

Living people
1948 births
Brooklyn College faculty